James J. "Jim" Lyons Jr. is an American politician who was the chairman of the Massachusetts Republican Party and represented the 18th Essex district in the Massachusetts House of Representatives for four terms. He was a member of the Judiciary Joint Committee and the Public Health Joint Committee.

Political career

Arlington School Committee
On March 5, 1977, Lyons placed second and was elected to a three-year term on the Arlington School Committee. He was elected on the same ballot in which voters rejected three non-binding questions pertaining to the potential Red Line extension into Arlington. He did not seek re-election in 1980.

State representative
On November 2, 2010, Lyons upset incumbent representative Barbara L'Italien. He was sworn in on January 5, 2011. Lyons's legislative priorities often focused on anti-abortion issues, fighting the Opioid epidemic, and advocating for local aid. He derailed a bill that would have added a gender-neutral option to Massachusetts driver's licenses, forced the state to reveal that it gave out $1.8 billion in public assistance to undocumented immigrants, and led an unsuccessful effort in the state legislature to remove Salem Superior Court Judge Timothy Feeley from the bench. He served as Ted Cruz's Massachusetts campaign chairman during the 2016 Republican presidential primary. Lyons was upset in the 2018 election by Democrat Tram Nguyen.

State party chairman
On January 17, 2019, Lyons was elected chairman of the Massachusetts Republican Party, defeating incumbent party treasurer Brent Andersen by a vote of 47 to 30. A conservative, Lyons did not have the support of the moderate state party establishment led by Governor Charlie Baker. Lyons also did not have the support of Donald Trump's Massachusetts campaign chairman, Vincent DeVito, who had endorsed Andersen in a public letter sent to supporters of Trump on May 31, 2016. On January 3, 2021, Lyons was reelected by a narrower margin of 39 to 36. As chairman, Lyons has aligned with the conservative and pro-Trump wings of the state party. Also as chairman, Lyons has embraced Trump's claims of fraud in the 2020 presidential election and has empowered the party's hardline conservatives.

Lyons repeatedly faced controversy during his tenure as chairman. In April, the state's top campaign finance regulator declared that various money transfers by the Massachusetts Republican Party were worthy of criminal prosecution and referred the case to Massachusetts Attorney General Maura Healey. Later that month, over two dozen Asian American Republicans in Boston alleged Lyons was discriminating against minority voters in an election of two candidates to the Republican State Committee. In May, Lyons, who opposes abortion, invited Georgia gubernatorial candidate Vernon Jones to a fundraiser in support of the Massachusetts Republican Party despite the fact that Jones opposed Georgia's anti-abortion "heartbeat bill" as a legislator.

In June 2021, Lyons ignited a media firestorm when he defended anti-gay remarks made by a member of the Massachusetts Republican State Committee, who said she was "sickened" to learn that a gay Republican congressional candidate had adopted children with his husband. The ensuing fallout led seven former chairs of the MassGOP and all but one of Massachusetts's elected Republican legislators to call for Lyons's resignation as chairman. In response, Lyons criticized the elected Republicans as a "woke mob" with a "cancel culture mentality." As the controversy continued to embroil Lyons, national Republicans distanced themselves from the MassGOP, with Congressman Dan Crenshaw and Congresswoman Cynthia Lummis canceling several previously planned fundraisers for the state party. By September, former White House Press Secretary Ari Fleischer had backed out of a heavily promoted party fundraiser "due to a conflict" with no new date having been announced.

Following Boston's preliminary municipal elections in September 2021, it was discovered that Lyons and the state GOP had spent thousands of dollars promoting a city council candidate who made racist comments about Boston mayoral frontrunner Michelle Wu. “ARE WE ABOUT TO ELECT A CHINESE CITIZEN TO CONTROL THE CITY OF BOSTON?” Palmer said in an Aug. 29 message that he posted to Twitter. It was accompanied by a photograph of mayoral contender Michelle Wu, who was born in Chicago and is the daughter of Taiwanese immigrants. Palmer paired her photo with one of Chinese leader Xi Jinping. In a July 10 post, Palmer wrote, “Earlier in the race I felt that the GOP were not interested in supporting me. That has all changed. Jim Lyons, the Mass. GOP chairman, is giving me massive support.”

It was reported that a Republican committeewoman informed Lyons of Palmer's anti-Asian social media posts back in August 2021 but that he rebuffed her proposition to withdraw his endorsement of Palmer. In October 2021, Governor Charlie Baker called for Lyons to resign due to the incident and other controversies. Lyons responded that he wouldn't resign and accused Baker of "abandoning the principles of the Republican Party". Soon after, the state party sent fundraising messages to supporters mocking Baker and linking to Trump's endorsement of gubernatorial candidate Geoff Diehl.

On January 30, 2023, Lyons lost his bid for a third term as party chair to Amy Carnevale.

References

|-

21st-century American politicians
Brandeis University alumni
Living people
Massachusetts Republican Party chairs
Republican Party members of the Massachusetts House of Representatives
People from Andover, Massachusetts
Year of birth missing (living people)